Where's Wally? The Wonder Book (U.S. title Where's Waldo? The Wonder Book) is the fifth book in the Where's Wally? illustration book series by Martin Handford, released in 1997. In the book Wally/Waldo, Wizard Whitebeard, Wenda, Woof, and Odlaw travel to fantasy worlds.

The book was the last Where's Wally? book for nine years. A special mini-version of the book has since been released.

Scenes
There are 12 scenes in the book:
 Once Upon a Page 
 The Mighty Fruit Fight 
 The Game of Games 
 Toys! Toys! Toys! 
 Bright Lights and Night Frights 
 The Cake Factory 
 The Battle of the Bands 
 The Odlaw Swamp 
 Clown Town 
 The Fantastic Flower Garden 
 The Corridors of Time 
 The Land of Woofs

British picture books
Puzzle books
Where's Wally? books
1997 children's books
British children's books